Nanping is a station on Line 3 of Chongqing Rail Transit in Chongqing Municipality, China. Line 10 will also reach here when Phase 2 is completed. The station is located in Nan'an District. It opened in 2011.

Station structure

Line 3

References

Railway stations in Chongqing
Railway stations in China opened in 2011
Chongqing Rail Transit stations